The 1999 Sparkassen Cup on Ice was the third event of six in the 1999–2000 ISU Grand Prix of Figure Skating, a senior-level international invitational competition series. It was held in Gelsenkirchen on November 11–14. Medals were awarded in the disciplines of men's singles, ladies' singles, pair skating, and ice dancing. Skaters earned points toward qualifying for the 1999–2000 Grand Prix Final.

Results

Men

Ladies

Pairs

Ice dancing

External links
 1999 Sparkassen Cup on Ice

Sparkassen Cup, 1999
Bofrost Cup on Ice